Estadio Chochi Sosa (Chochi sosa Stadium) is a  sports and concert venue located in Tegucigalpa, Honduras. It was completed in the late 80s and is part of the Tegucigalpa Olympic Village.

History 
The Chochi Sosa Stadium was built in 1989 in the Tegucigalpa Olympic Village during the government of liberal President José Azcona del Hoyo. It belongs to the Honduran government, is a public sports complex and is maintained by the National Sports Commission (CONDEPOR) with a budget of 10 million lempiras per month.

Fame 
The stadium is famous due to the several hundred concerts that have taken place inside it, among them artists such as Luis Miguel, Vicente Fernandez, and Vilma Palma e Vampiros.

Gallery

References 

Baseball in Honduras
Baseball venues in North America
1989 establishments in Honduras
Sports venues completed in 1989
Sport in Tegucigalpa